This is a list of Gazelle FC players.  Gazelle FC is a football club from Chad based in N'Djamena and plays at Stade Omnisports Idriss Mahamat Ouya. The club was formed on 16 May 1972.

List of players

Notes

References